Saint Chlodulf (Clodulphe or Clodould) (605 – June 8, 696 or 697, others say May 8, 697) was bishop of Metz approximately from 657 to 697.

Life

Chlodulf was the son of Arnulf, bishop of Metz, and the brother of Ansegisel, mayor of the palace of Austrasia.

Before his ordination Chlodulf had married an unknown woman and had begotten a son called Aunulf.

In 657, he became bishop of Metz, the third successor of his father, "despite a reputation for impiety in his youth". He held that office for 40 years. During this time he richly decorated the cathedral St. Stephen. He also was in close contact with Saint Gertrude of Nivelles, sister to his brother's wife, Begga.

He died in Metz and was buried in the church of St. Arnulf. In Nivelles he was locally venerated as Saint Clou, especially because of his connection to Saint Gertrude. His Feast Day is June 8.

Butler's account

The hagiographer Alban Butler (1710–1773) wrote in his Lives of the Fathers, Martyrs, and Other Principal Saints under June 8,

References

Sources

690s deaths
Pippinids
7th-century Frankish bishops
Bishops of Metz
605 births
7th-century Frankish saints